Mount Chapman is a mountain in the Great Smoky Mountains, located in the Southeastern United States.  It has an elevation of 6,417 feet (1,956 m) above sea level.  While the mountain is located deep within the Great Smokies, the Appalachian Trail crosses its eastern slope, coming to within  of the summit.  Mount Chapman is among the 10 highest mountains in the Appalachian range, if subpeaks are not included.

Mount Chapman is situated along the Tennessee-North Carolina border, with Sevier County to the north and Swain County to the south. Like its neighbor Mount Guyot, Chapman is a double peak, with the southern peak being the true summit. A  gap divides Chapman from Dashoga Ridge (i.e., Mount Hardison and Marks Knob), just two miles (3 km) to the east. Chapman Lead parallels Guyot Spur to the north, with Buck Fork slicing between the two giant ridges. The mountain's summit is coated in a dense stand of Southern Appalachian spruce-fir forest.

The remoteness of Mount Chapman has left it largely untouched by human history.  The mountain is named after Colonel David C. Chapman (1876-1944), a Knoxville business leader who led efforts to establish a national park in the Great Smokies.  As head of the Tennessee Great Smoky Mountains Park Commission from 1927 to 1937, Chapman raised funds and negotiated hundreds of land purchases that would make the park possible.  Arnold Guyot crossed Mount Chapman in the late 1850s, measuring the mountain's summit at 6,447 feet (Guyot called it "Mount Alexander" after a Princeton colleague).  The leg of the Appalachian Trail crossing Chapman's eastern slope was constructed in 1935.

A short bushwhack is required to reach the summit. 
    

See also
List of mountains in North Carolina

References

External links 

Great Smoky Mountains National Park Trail Map - .pdf format
Mount Chapman - Peakbagger.com
The Southern Sixers - SummitPost.org
South Beyond 6000 in the Smokies - Challenge sponsored by the Carolina Hiking Club and the Tennessee Eastman Hiking and Canoeing Club

Mountains of Great Smoky Mountains National Park
Mountains on the Appalachian Trail
Mountains of North Carolina
Mountains of Tennessee
Southern Sixers
Protected areas of Sevier County, Tennessee
Protected areas of Swain County, North Carolina
Mountains of Swain County, North Carolina
Mountains of Sevier County, Tennessee